Andres Noormets (born 1 October 1963 in Paide) is an Estonian theatre actor, director and theatre pedagogue.

1988 he graduated from Tallinn State Conservatory Stage Art Department.

Besides theatre roles he has also played on several films and television series (e.g. Wikmani poisid, 1995).

In 2018 he was awarded with Order of the White Star, IV class.

Staging works

 Unamuno' and Noormets' "Ühe kire lugu (1992)
 Wilde' and Noormets' "Dorian Gray portree" (1993)
 Rummo's "Valguse põik" (1993)

References

Living people
1963 births
Estonian male stage actors
Estonian male film actors
Estonian male television actors
20th-century Estonian male actors
21st-century Estonian male actors
Estonian theatre directors
Estonian Academy of Music and Theatre alumni
Recipients of the Order of the White Star, 4th Class
People from Paide